The Battle of Kirkuk was a battle in the city of Kirkuk in northern Iraq between Iraqi Kurdistan and allies and the Islamic State of Iraq and the Levant. The battle occurred less than a week after the beginning of the Battle of Mosul launched by Iraqi security forces and allies.

The battle
On 21 October 2016, dozens of ISIL militants and suicide bombers, supported by local sleeper cells, entered Kirkuk and stormed a power station and police stations in the city, killing 18 members of security forces and power station workers, including 2–5 Iranian workers. The ISIL militants captured a mosque and an abandoned hotel and barricaded themselves inside. Hours later, ISIL captured 2 more hotels and holed themselves in. Over 20 ISIL militants were killed, as security forces recaptured most of the buildings.

By the next day, ISIL forces still held parts of the Aruba District and a hotel, though these were retaken later on. Government forces then began a mop-up operation to clear the city of remaining militants, with some of the latter blowing themselves as they were cornered. Many local civilians had also taken up arms, hunting, capturing and killing ISIL fighters.

On 23 October, several remaining ISIL attackers attempted to flee the city, with five being killed and the ISIL operations leader captured by security forces. On 24 October, the last ISIL fighters in Kirkuk were killed, including the raid commander Abu Qudama, a senior ISIL military figure of Hawija, so that the governor of Kirkuk, Nadschmeddin Karim, could declare the city completely cleared of militants. On the next day, security forces arrested Nizar Mahmud Abdul Ghani, a cousin of former President of Iraq Saddam Hussein, for having participated in the Kirkuk raid.

See also
2018 As-Suwayda attacks

References

Conflicts in 2016
2016 in Iraq
Military operations of the Iraqi Civil War in 2016
Military operations of the War in Iraq (2013–2017) involving the Islamic State of Iraq and the Levant
October 2016 events in Iraq
Battle